Rotary Connection is the debut album of the American psychedelic soul band Rotary Connection. It was released in 1968 on Cadet Concept Records. The album rose to No. 37 on the Billboard 200 chart.

Track listing
 "Amen" (Marshall Paul, Charles Stepney) – 4:03
 "Rapid Transit" (Paul, Stepney) – 0:38
 "Turn Me On" (Sidney Barnes, Greg Perry) – 3:19
 "Pink Noise" (Paul, Stepney) – 0:22
 "Lady Jane" (Mick Jagger, Keith Richards) – 5:00
 "Like a Rolling Stone" (Bob Dylan) – 4:51
 "Soul Man" (Isaac Hayes, David Porter) – 3:01
 "Sursum Mentes" (Paul, Stepney) – 0:43
 "Didn't Want to Have to Do It" (John Sebastian) – 3:11
 "Black Noise" (Paul, Stepney) – 0:22
 "Memory Band" (Richard Rudolph, Stepney) – 3:20
 "Ruby Tuesday" (Jagger, Richards) – 4:27
 "Rotary Connection" (Paul, Stepney) – 2:51

Personnel 
Rotary Connection
 Mitch Aliotta – vocals (lead vocals on "Lady Jane" and "Soul Man")
 Minnie Riperton – vocals (lead vocals on "Memory Band")
  Sidney Barnes – vocals 
 Bobby Simms – vocals (lead vocals on "Amen", "Turn Me On" and "Didn't Want to Have to Do It")
 Kenny Venegas – vocals
 Judy Hauff - vocals (lead vocals on "Amen", "Turn Me On", "Lady Jane", "Like a Rolling Stone", "Soul Man" and "Ruby Tuesday")
 Charles Stepney – keyboards 
 Marshall Chess - Theremin
Extra musicians
 Bill Bradley – electronic effects 
 David Chausow – leader
 Bobby Christian – guitar 
 Pete Cosey – guitar 
 Morris Jennings – drums 
 Louis Satterfield – bass
 Phil Upchurch – bass
 Chuck Barksdale - bass vocals
Technical 
 Marshall Chess – producer 
 Doug Brand – engineer 
 Andy McKaie – reissue producer 
 Mark Omann – remastering 
 Charles Stepney – arranger, producer
 Curt Cole Burkhart – photography 
 Robert Pruter – liner notes

Charts

USA

References

1968 debut albums
Rotary Connection albums
Albums arranged by Charles Stepney
Albums produced by Marshall Chess
Albums produced by Charles Stepney
Cadet Records albums
MCA Records albums
Chess Records albums